The 1979 British National Track Championships were a series of track cycling competitions held from late July to early August 1979 at the Leicester Velodrome.

Medal summary

Men's Events

Women's Events

References

1979 in British sport
July 1979 sports events in the United Kingdom
August 1979 sports events in the United Kingdom